Robert Ewich Farmstead is a historic home and farm located at Augusta, St. Charles County, Missouri. The house was built about 1865, and is a two-story, three-bay, front-gabled, red brick dwelling on a stone foundation.  The house measures approximately 35 feet wide and 30 feet deep and has a central-passage plan.  Also on the property is a contributing board-and-batten barn dated to about 1865.

It was added to the National Register of Historic Places in 1995.

References

Farms on the National Register of Historic Places in Missouri
Houses completed in 1865
Buildings and structures in St. Charles County, Missouri
National Register of Historic Places in St. Charles County, Missouri